The Italy women's national rugby union sevens team is a Rugby sevens national women's side that represents Italy. They have only qualified once to the Rugby World Cup Sevens. At the 2021 Rugby Europe Women's Sevens Championship Series held in Lisbon and Moscow, Spain finished third overall.

Tournament History

Rugby World Cup Sevens

Women's Sevens Grand Prix

Current squad
Sara Barattin
Lucia Cammarano	
Maria Grazia Cioffi	
Marta Ferrari	
Manuela Furlan	
Miriam Keller	
Cristina Molic	
Michela Sillari	
Sofia Stefan	
Claudia Tedeschi	
Maria Diletta Veronese	
Cecilia Zublena
Bianca Coltellini

References

External links
  Italian Rugby Federation Official site

Women's national rugby sevens teams
Sevens